Najla is a given name. It may refer to:

Najla Aljeraiwi, Kuwaiti cyclist
Najla AlKanderi, Kuwaiti television and radio presenter
Sheikha Najla Al Qasimi, Emirati diplomat
Najla Al-Sonboli, Yemeni paediatrician
Najla Ayoubi, Afghan women's rights defender, lawyer and former judge
Najla Ben Abdallah, Tunisian actress and model
Najla Bouden, Prime Minister of Tunisia
Najla Faisal Al Awadhi, Emirati former MP
Najla Jabor (1915-2001), Brazilian conductor and composer
Najla Kassab, Lebanese church minister
Najla Mangoush, Libyan lawyer and diplomat
Najla Said (born 1974), American-Palestinian author and actress

See also
TS Najla, former North Sea ferry